Massachusetts House of Representatives' 18th Middlesex district in the United States is one of 160 legislative districts included in the lower house of the Massachusetts General Court. It covers part of the city of Lowell in Middlesex County. Democrat Rady Mom of Lowell has represented the district since 2015.

The current district geographic boundary overlaps with that of the Massachusetts Senate's 1st Middlesex district.

Representatives
 Charles K. Tucker, circa 1858 
 A. W. Crowninshield, circa 1859 
 Samuel Otis Upham, circa 1888 
 Erskine Warden, circa 1888 
 Samuel W. Mendum, circa 1920 
 Walter S. Parker, circa 1920 
 Frank Daniel Tanner, circa 1951 
 Malcolm Stuart White, circa 1951 
 David J. Mofenson, circa 1975 
 David Nangle, 1999-2003
 Kevin J. Murphy
 Rady Mom, 2015-current

Former locales
The district previously covered:
 Boxborough, circa 1872 
 Hudson, circa 1872 
 Littleton, circa 1872 
 Stow, circa 1872

See also
 List of Massachusetts House of Representatives elections
 List of Massachusetts General Courts
 List of former districts of the Massachusetts House of Representatives
 Other Middlesex County districts of the Massachusetts House of Representatives: 1st, 2nd, 3rd, 4th, 5th, 6th, 7th, 8th, 9th, 10th, 11th, 12th, 13th, 14th, 15th, 16th, 17th, 19th, 20th, 21st, 22nd, 23rd, 24th, 25th, 26th, 27th, 28th, 29th, 30th, 31st, 32nd, 33rd, 34th, 35th, 36th, 37th

Images
Portraits of legislators

References

External links
 Ballotpedia
  (State House district information based on U.S. Census Bureau's American Community Survey).
 League of Women Voters of Greater Lowell

House
Government of Middlesex County, Massachusetts